Aphanius anatoliae, the Anatolian giant killifish or Lake Tuz toothcarp, is a species of fish in the family Cyprinodontidae. It is endemic to Turkey. It is known from freshwater springs and streams around Lake Tuz, as well as from the Lake Beyşehir basin and from Konya eastward to Niğde. It lives in clear, well-oxygenated running freshwaters. It is threatened by water abstraction and the drying out of streams and springs. It is also impacted by the introduction of Gambusia species.

References

anatoliae
Endemic fauna of Turkey
Near threatened animals
Taxonomy articles created by Polbot
Fish described in 1912